Zahara may refer to:

Places
Zahara de la Sierra, a municipality in the province of Cádiz, Andalusia, Spain
Zahara de los Atunes, a village on the Costa de la Luz in the province of Cádiz, Andalusia, Spain

People

Stage name
BeBe Zahara Benet (born 1980), Cameroonian-American drag queen
Zahara (Spanish musician) (born 1983), Spanish singer-songwriter
Zahara (South African musician) (born 1987), South African musician and poet

Given name
Zahara Rubin (born 1932), Israeli sculptor, painter and artist
Zahara Schatz (1916–1999), Israeli artist

Other uses
Zahara (band), a jazz ensemble

See also
 Sahara (disambiguation)